Botryomycosis; is a rare chronic granulomatous bacterial infection that affects the skin, and sometimes the viscera.

Botryomycosis has been known to affect humans, horses, cattle, swine, dogs and cats.

Presentation

Associated conditions
There are only a handful of documented cases of botryomycosis in humans, and its pathogenesis is not completely understood. However, it is usually described in individuals with impaired immunity, or with an underlying disease such as diabetes mellitus, cystic fibrosis or HIV infection.

Causes
Staphylococcus aureus is usually the organism that causes the infection, however it can also be caused by Pseudomonas aeruginosa, Pneumocystis carinii, Proteus spp. and Actinobacillus lignieresii or other species of bacteria. The anatomic structure of its lesion is similar to that of actinomycosis and eumycetoma, and its granules resemble the sulfur granules of actinomycosis.

Diagnosis

History
The disease was originally discovered by Otto Bollinger (1843–1909) in 1870, and its name was coined by Sebastiano Rivolta (1832–1893) in 1884. The name refers to its grape-like granules (Gr.  = grapes) and the mistakenly implied  fungal etiology (Gr.  = fungus). In 1919 the bacterial origin of the infection was discovered.

Notes

Concise Review of Veterinary Microbiology - Quinn and Markey 2003

External links
 Essay on Pulmonary Botryomycosis

Bacterial diseases
Bacterium-related cutaneous conditions